The white-backed duck (Thalassornis leuconotus) is a waterbird of the family Anatidae. It is distinct from all other ducks, but most closely related to the whistling ducks in the subfamily Dendrocygninae, though also showing some similarities to the stiff-tailed ducks in the subfamily Oxyurinae. It is the only member of the genus Thalassornis.

Description
These birds are well adapted for diving. On occasions they have been observed to stay under water for up to half a minute. They search especially for the bulbs of waterlilies, but also seeds and leaves of waterlilies and other water plants and the young feed on lake flies larvae as well. From danger, they also escape preferentially by diving; hence, the namesake white back is hardly visible in life.

Distribution and habitat
White-backed ducks live in Africa, especially between Senegal and Chad in the west, Ethiopia in the east, and South Africa in the south. Their habitat consists of lakes, ponds, swamps and marshes where they are well camouflaged against predators.

Subspecies
There are two subspecies, Thalassornis leuconotus leuconotus and Thalassornis leuconotus insularis. The latter lives entirely on Madagascar and is considered endangered as a result of hunting, habitat loss and the introduction of competing exotic species.

Conservation
The white-backed duck is one of the species to which the Agreement on the Conservation of African-Eurasian Migratory Waterbirds (AEWA) applies.

Woolaver and Nichols conducted a nesting survey of the Madagascar race in 2001 at Lake Antsamaka in western Madagascar. They found a total of 37, indicating the significance of this single site for the conservation of this insular subspecies. Young, et al. (2006) suggested that an earlier population estimate of 2,500–5,000 total birds in Madagascar by Delany and Scott may be too optimistic. Its African population may be in the range of 10,000 to 25,000 birds.

Notes

References
 Kear, J. 2005. Ducks, Geese and Swans. 2 vol. Oxford, UK: Oxford Univ. Press.
 Woolaver. L., and R. Nichols. 2006. Nesting survey of the white-backed duck at Lake Antsamaka in western Madagascar. TWSG News 15:34–37.
 Young, H. G., R. Safford, F. Hawkins, R. Rabarisoa, & F. Razafindrajao, 2006. Madagascar whitebacked duck: What is its true status? TWSG News 15:38–40.
Delany, S., & D. A. Scott. 2006. Waterfowl Population Estimates. 4th ed. Netherlands: Wetlands International.
 Johnsgard, P. 2010 "The World’s Waterfowl in the 21st Century: A 2010 Supplement to Ducks, Geese, and Swans of the World"

External links

Species text in The Atlas of Southern African Birds

white-backed duck
Birds of Sub-Saharan Africa
white-backed duck
white-backed duck